Oran Leo "Tony" McPherson (April 12, 1886 – May 23, 1949) was a member of the Legislative Assembly of Alberta (Canada) for Little Bow from 1921 to 1935 as a member of the United Farmers of Alberta.

Early life
He was born in Kingman, Kansas, United States in 1886 and attended the University of Illinois before moving to Alberta in 1906.

Political career
He served as speaker of the assembly from 1922 to 1926. He also later served as the Minister of Public Works.

In 1932, he had a nasty divorce that made headlines across Alberta newspapers. This was one of the events that hurt the United Farmers and gave them the reputation of being afflicted by moral decay that would help lead the party to its demise in 1935 at the hands of Social Credit.

References

Bibliography

External links
Speaker of the Assembly
McPherson Scandal

Speakers of the Legislative Assembly of Alberta
1886 births
1949 deaths
United Farmers of Alberta MLAs
Members of the Executive Council of Alberta